Crimson Moonlight  is a Swedish black metal band. The band was formed in the summer of 1997 with the mere intention of recording a primitive old school black metal demo and playing one show before breaking up. However, the breakup never happened, and they have since recorded two EPs and three full-length albums. They were previously signed to Rivel Records, currently to Endtime Productions. They have toured US twice, and have been featured in two metal documentary films.

History

Beginning (1997–1999)
Crimson Moonlight was formed by Simon "Pilgrim" Rosén (vocals), Gustav "Gurra" Elowsson (drums), Petter Stenmarker (guitar, keyboards), Jonathan Jansson (guitar), and Simon Lindh (bass) in the summer of 1997. They recorded a demo called Glorification of the Master of Light. Originally, their intention was to split the band after recording that demo, but they decided to carry on. In the year 1998, they recorded their first studio EP titled Eternal Emperor, which presented a more keyboard-driven symphonic black metal style, in contrast to the more primitive, Horde-inspired music found on their demo. In 1998, Crimson Moonlight released a live album titled Live in Varsås, and in 2001 released their second demo titled Heralding the Dawn.

The Covenant Progress and Veil of Remembrance (2000–2006)
A few years later, Crimson Moonlight signed a record deal with Rivel Records, a small Swedish label held by Christian Rivel. During that time, Jonathan Jansson and Simon Lindh left the band. Hubertus Liljegren, formerly of the then-split-up group Sanctifica, along with Per Sundberg, joined Crimson Moonlight as guitarists. In 2003, Crimson Moonlight recorded their first studio album titled The Covenant Progress. Musically, the album took a more melodic black metal direction with less emphasis on symphonic keyboards. The album received positive reviews from metal music media, and by 2005 it had sold 2300 copies. During 2003, Crimson Moonlight played several tours around Europe to support The Covenant Progress.

In 2004, Crimson Moonlight recorded their second album titled Veil of Remembrance. The album showcased several changes in the band's style: they left keyboards in order to achieve a far more brutal sound, and went to incorporate grindcore and brutal death metal influences into their sound, inspired by groups such as Nile, Origin, Rotten Sound, and Nasum. During the studio sessions, Jani Stefanovic (of Divinefire, Renascent, and many other band's fame) was in Crimson Moonlight's line-up and had a notable role in creating their new style, now called death/black metal. Just like its predecessor, Veil of Remembrance was officially released on January 26, 2005 although it was already available since December 4, 2004. The album received positive reviews like its predecessor, but ended up selling fewer copies than The Covenant Progress. In an interview with Harm magazine, the band believed that p2p-filesharing affected the low sales. They toured Europe again to support the album. At the end of 2004, they also released a compilation album titled Songs from the Archives, which included the Eternal Emperor EP, tracks from both albums, demo tracks, and live recordings.

Following this, the band went through some line-up changes. Both Hubertus Liljegren and Jani Stefanovic left, as did Erik Tordsson. Johan Ylenstrand joined as a bassist. Ylenstrand and Elowsson also play in a deathgrind band called Exhale, which has released one album and played at a US death metal festival called Maryland Deathfest. In 2006, Elowsson received endorsements of the drumming gear companies Sabian, Pearl, Remo, and Vic Firth.

In Depths of Dreams Unconscious (2006–2011)
In 2006, Crimson Moonlight's deal with Rivel Records had come to an end and the band began searching for new label. On June 17, 2006, the extreme metal label Endtime Productions announced that they signed Crimson Moonlight. Crimson Moonlight had recorded an EP in profound secrecy. During the summer, Crimson Moonlight played their first tour in the United States and sold the pre-release pressings of their new recording, which was entitled In Depths of Dreams Unconscious. It featured two new songs and a re-recording of a song from their first demo. Musically, the EP continued on their death/black metal direction with a more melodic setting. The official release also contained an instrumental intro done by Swedish neoclassical group Arcana. In Depths of Dreams Unconscious was officially released February 1, 2007. In the summer of 2007, Crimson Moonlight played at the Cornerstone Festival in Bushnell, Illinois for the second time since 2006.

Brief hiatus and Divine Darkness (2011–present)
In late 2011, after a hiatus, the band launched an official Facebook site, played at NordicFest and announced that they were working on a new album.
In 2014 they released the single The Suffering, which was part of their album Divine Darkness, released via Endtime Productions on February 26, 2016. Pilgrim did an interview in March 2016, stating the lineup consisted of himself, Gurra, Johan Ylenstrand, and Per Sundberg. The band is currently working on a new album titled Epiklesis - Maranatha.

Members
Current line-up

Former members

Timeline

Discography

References

External links 
 Crimson Moonlight Official Facebook page
 
 Crimson Moonlight at Encyclopaedia Metallum

Swedish death metal musical groups
Swedish Christian metal musical groups
Swedish black metal musical groups
Symphonic black metal musical groups
Musical groups established in 1997